This article displays the squads for the 2017 World Women's Handball Championship. Each team consists of up to 28 players, of whom 16 may be fielded for each match.

Age, club, caps and goals as of 1 December 2017.

Group A

Angola
The squad was announced on 23 November 2017.

Head coach: Morten Soubak

France
A 21-player squad was announced on 20 November 2017. The final squad was revealed on 1 December 2017. On 9 December 2017, Astride N'Gouan replaced Orlane Kanor. The change was reversed six days later.

Head coach: Olivier Krumbholz

Paraguay
Head coach: Neri Vera

Romania
A 20-player squad was announced on 10 November 2017. The final squad was revealed on 26 November 2017. Gabriella Szűcs replaced Mădălina Zamfirescu on 8 December 2017.

Head coach: Ambros Martín

Slovenia
A 19-player squad was announced on 20 November 2017. The final roster was revealed on 30 November 2017.

Head coach: Uroš Bregar

Spain
The squad was announced on 3 November 2017, before Seynabou Mbengue was added on 27 November 2017. The final squad was revealed on 1 December 2017.

Head coach: Carlos Viver

Group B

Argentina
The squad was announced on 9 November 2017.

Head coach: Eduardo Peruchena

Czech Republic
An 18-player squad was announced on 25 November 2017. The final squad was revealed on 29 November 2017.

Head coach: Jan Bašný

Hungary
A 19-player squad was announced on 10 November 2017. The final squad was revealed on 29 November 2017. Zita Szucsánszki was called up on 6 December 2017.

Head coach: Kim Rasmussen

Norway
The squad was announced on 7 November 2017. On 17 December 2017, Silje Solberg replaced Helene Gigstad Fauske in the squad.

Head coach: Thorir Hergeirsson

Poland
An 18-player squad was announced on 21 November 2017. The final squad was revealed on 1 December 2017. On 7 December 2017, Monika Michałów was called up. Hanna Rycharska replaced Joanna Drabik on 10 December 2017.

Head coach: Leszek Krowicki

Sweden
The squad was announced on 2 November 2017. On 2 December 2017, Louise Sand was taken out of the squad due to an injury, but was added back a day later.

Head coach: Henrik Signell

Group C

Brazil
A 17-player squad was announced on 9 November 2017. The final squad was revealed on 1 December 2017. On 5 December 2017, Deonise Fachinello was added to squad, replacing Gabriela Moreschi.

Head coach: Jorge Dueñas

Denmark
A 28-player squad was announced on 31 October 2017. The final squad was revealed on 8 November 2017. On 15 November 2017, Rikke Iversen replaced Stine Bodholt Nielsen who had to withdraw from the squad due to an injury. On 30 November 2017, Simone Böhme was added to the squad as Trine Østergaard still hasn't recovered from an injury, leaving Rikke Iversen out of the squad. On 6 December 2017, Trine Østergaard was added back in the squad. On 9 December 2017, Stine Bodholt Nielsen replaced Kristina Kristiansen.

Head coach: Klavs Bruun Jørgensen

Japan
Head coach: Ulrik Kirkely

Montenegro
An 18-player squad was announced on 20 November 2017.

Head coach: Per Johansson

Russia
A 22-player squad was announced on 17 November 2017. On 20 November 2017, Elizaveta Malashenko replaced Victoria Zhilinskayte in the squad due to a pregnancy. On 27 November 2017, the squad was reduced to 18 players. The final squad was published on 2 December 2017. Ekaterina Matlashova replaced Yekaterina Ilyina on 11 December 2017. On 13 December 2017, Yekaterina Ilyina replaced Anastasiia Makina.

Head coach: Yevgeni Trefilov

Tunisia
An 18-player squad was announced on 4 October 2017.

Head coach: Issam Lahyani

Group D

Cameroon
Head coach: Jean Zambo

China
Head coach: Jesper Holmris

Germany
A 28-player squad was announced on 1 November 2017. The final squad was revealed on 1 December 2017. On 3 December 2017, Alicia Stolle replaced due to an injury. Emily Bölk was added on 5 December 2017. Dinah Eckerle replaced Antje Lauenroth on 8 December 2017.

Head coach: Michael Biegler

Netherlands
The first 14 players were announced on 13 November 2017. The final squad was revealed on 28 November 2017. Pearl van der Wissel replaced Angela Steenbakkers on 9 December 2017.

Head coach: Helle Thomsen

Serbia
An 18-player squad was announced on 29 November 2017. The final squad was revealed on 2 December 2017.

Head coach: Ljubomir Obradović

South Korea
An 18-player squad was used under a tournament in Norway in late November. The final squad was revealed on 2 December 2017. On 3 December 2017, Jung Ji-in replaced Gwon Han-na in the squad due to an injury. On 5 December 2017, Jeong Jin-hui replaced Gim Bo-eun in the squad due to an injury.

Head coach: Kang Jae-won

References

External links
Official website

World Handball Championship squads
2017 in women's handball